The Toronto radial lines were interurban lines radiating from Toronto, Ontario, Canada. All are now defunct.
 
 Toronto and York Radial Railway acquired the following companies converting each into an operating division:
 Metropolitan Street Railway (T&YRR Metropolitan Division)
Schomberg and Aurora Railway (acquired by the Metropolitan Street Railway; became T&YRR Schomberg Branch)
 North Yonge Railways (a remnant of the T&YRR Metropolitan Division operated by the Toronto Transportation Commission from 1930 to 1948)
 Toronto and Scarboro' Electric Railway, Light and Power Company (T&YRR Scarboro Division)
 Toronto and Mimico Electric Railway and Light Company (T&YRR Mimico Division)
 Toronto Suburban Railway, of which a small section of track became part of Halton County Radial Railway, a working museum
 Toronto Eastern Railway, built as far as Bowmanville but never operated commercially

Gray Coach, a publicly owned interurban bus service founded in 1927, went on to provide service along many of the routes previously served by the radial railways.

See also 
 Hydro Electric Railways, Toronto and York Division

Interurban railways in Ontario
Defunct Ontario railways
Electric railways in Canada